Norma Christine Waterson  (15 August 1939 – 30 January 2022) was an English singer and songwriter, best known as one of the original members of The Watersons, a celebrated English traditional folk group. Other members of the group included her brother Mike Waterson and sister Lal Waterson, a cousin John Harrison and, in later incarnations of the group, her husband Martin Carthy.

Waterson was known as the "matriarch of the royal family of British folk music."

Early life 
Waterson was born in Hull, East Riding of Yorkshire, and, after being orphaned at an early age, was brought up there, with her brother Mike and sister Lal, by their maternal grandmother, Eliza Ward, who ran a second-hand shop during the Second World War, and who was of Irish Gypsy descent. She said her grandmother was "a lovely singer and knew a lot of parlour ballads and musical songs she had learned from her childhood, and we all used to sing them." They had an uncle who played lead cornet as a young man in the pit bands in the early days of sound cinema; another uncle played the banjo and organ, and their father had played guitar and banjo.

The Watersons 
The band originated in the early 1960s with members Norma, brother Mike, and sister Elaine known as Lal, with their cousin John Harrison from Kingston High School. They had a skiffle band in the early 1960s but moved on to playing more traditional material. They were briefly known as "the Folksons". Their first recordings were for the Topic Records sampler New Voices and their first album, Frost and Fire, both from 1965. Frost and Fire was awarded the Melody Maker Album of the Year, a rarity for a debut album. The albums The Watersons and A Yorkshire Garland followed in 1966. The Watersons split up in 1968, when Norma went to work as a DJ on a radio station on Montserrat. She stayed there for three to four years and worked as a DJ for Radio Antilles.

The group reformed in 1972, with John Harrison briefly replaced by Bernie Vickers. In that year they performed and arranged the music for the Alan Plater TV Play for Today, "The Land of Green Ginger", set and filmed in Hull, and appeared in a scene filmed in the Bluebell Folk Club. Vickers was replaced the same year by Waterson's husband, Martin Carthy. This line-up recorded For Pence and Spicy Ale (1975), Sound, Sound Your Instruments of Joy (1977), and Green Fields (1981).

Later line-ups featured Mike Waterson's daughter Rachel Waterson, who briefly replaced Lal during a leave of absence caused by ill health in the mid-1980s, then continued to sing with the group on Lal's return. This five-piece line up performed regularly during the late 1980s and recorded a session for the BBC Andy Kershaw show in August 1986. In 1987, the group collaborated with Swan Arcade to form Blue Murder, who performed and recorded sporadically with various line-ups. Subsequent Watersons line-ups fluctuated, featuring Waterson's daughter Eliza Carthy, Anne Waterson, Jill Pidd and Maria Gilhooley at various times, but recording only occasionally.

Lal Waterson died in 1998 and, by the early 1990s, Carthy, Waterson and their daughter Eliza had formed the group Waterson:Carthy. The Watersons gradually ceased to sing live on a regular basis, but the family occasionally reconvened for special events and festival appearances, where they are usually billed as "The Waterson Family". These have included "A Mighty River of Song" at the Royal Albert Hall on 12 May 2007, the BBC Radio 2 Electric Proms concert, "Once in a Blue Moon: A Tribute to Lal Waterson", at Cecil Sharp House in London on 25 October 2007 and "A Tribute to Bert," a concert celebrating the life and work of Albert Lancaster Lloyd, at Cecil Sharp House on 15 November 2008. During the summer of 2009, "The Waterson Family" performed at a number of festivals and large concerts throughout England and Ireland.

Later career 
Her eponymously titled solo debut Norma Waterson was produced by John Chelew and released by Hannibal Records in 1996, and was well received in the scene (including a nomination for the Mercury Music Prize), featuring collaborations with her daughter Eliza, husband Martin Carthy and other members of The Watersons, as well as Danny Thompson (Pentangle), Richard Thompson (Fairport Convention) and Roger Swallow (the Albion Band). In 1999, the follow-up The Very Thought of You was released by Hannibal Records and once again featured Richard Thompson, Danny Thompson, Eliza Carthy and husband Martin Carthy.

In 2001 she released her first solo traditional folk album, Bright Shiny Morning, on Topic Records. She appeared on a variety of collective recordings, notably Peter Bellamy's The Transports. In 2008 Waterson made a guest appearance alongside brother Mike on Scottish musician James Yorkston's album When the Haar Rolls In, singing her sister Lal's song, "Midnight Feast".

In 2009 the accompanying book to the Topic Records 70-year anniversary boxed set Three Score and Ten lists two Watersons albums and one Waterson:Carthy album as classic albums. These are Frost and Fire, For Pence and Spicy Ale and Waterson:Carthy. The tracks that Norma performs on are Hal-An-Tow (track 11 on the second CD), Three Score and Ten (track 17), We Poor Labouring Men with Waterson:Carthy (track 21 on the sixth CD) and, with Blue Murder,  "No One Stands Alone" (track 22 of the seventh CD).

In 2010 Waterson released an album of collaborations with her daughter Eliza entitled Gift. BBC reviewer Laura Barton wrote: "The gift in question here, one gathers, is a handing of talent from generation to generation; Norma Waterson and Eliza Carthy are, after all, the sublimely gifted mother and daughter who make up part of British folk's great dynasty." Commenting on the final song, "Shallow Brown", the reviewer noted: "Backed variously by other family members, including Eliza's father Martin Carthy on guitar as well as her cousin Oliver Knight on electric guitar, vocals and cello, there is a real sense of congregation and rootedness about this song, and indeed this record as a whole. Long may the dynasty flourish."

In 2016 Waterson received the Lifetime Achievement Award at the BBC Radio 2 Folk Awards alongside Joan Armatrading.

Waterson was known as the "matriarch of the royal family of British folk music". She continued to sing well in her 70s, and was described as "a hard-working, prolific artist who refused to stop recording or touring." Her final album, released in 2018, was Anchor, the second recorded with Eliza. It includes Waterson singing lead on a dramatic, jazz-edged treatment of the Tom Waits song "Strange Weather" and on a version of Nick Lowe's "The Beast in Me".

Personal life and death 
Waterson married Martin Carthy in 1972. Their daughter Eliza was born in 1975. 

She was awarded the MBE (Member of the Order of the British Empire) in the Queen's 2003 New Year Honours, for her services to folk music.

Waterson died on 30 January 2022, at the age of 82. She had been suffering from pneumonia.

Selected discography

With The Watersons 

(all on Topic Records unless shown otherwise)

 Frost and Fire (1965)
 The Watersons (1966)
 A Yorkshire Garland (1966)
 For Pence and Spicy Ale (1975)
 A True Hearted Girl (1977) (Lal & Norma Waterson with Maria Waterson)
 Sound, Sound Your Instruments of Joy (1977)
 Green Fields (1981)
 Early Days (1994)
 Mighty River of Song (2004)
 A Yorkshire Christmas (Witchwood Collection, 2005)

With Waterson:Carthy 

(all on Topic Records)

 Waterson:Carthy (1994)
 Common Tongue (1996)
 Broken Ground (1999)
 A Dark Light (2002)
 Fishes And Fine Yellow Sand (2004)
 Holy Heathens and the Old Green Man (2006)

Solo discography
 Norma Waterson (Hannibal Records, 1996)
 The Very Thought of You (Hannibal Records, 1999)
 Bright Shiny Morning (Topic Records, 2001)
 Gift (Topic Records, 2010) with Eliza Carthy
 Anchor (Topic Records, 2018) with Eliza Carthy and the Gift Band

References

External links
 
 
 Norma Waterson, one of the greats of British folk music who burst on to the scene with her family in the 1960s – obituary at The Daily Telegraph 
 Norma Waterson obituary at The Times  
  from Broken Ground (1999)

1939 births
2022 deaths
Members of the Order of the British Empire
20th-century English singers
20th-century English women singers
21st-century English singers
21st-century English women singers
Blue Murder (folk group) members
English folk musicians
English folk singers
Musicians from Kingston upon Hull
Waterson–Carthy members
The Watersons members
Deaths from pneumonia in the United Kingdom
English people of Irish descent